Donald Athey Minnick (April 14, 1931 – September 2, 2016) was an American Major League Baseball (MLB) pitcher. Minnick played for the Washington Senators in 1957.

References

External links

1931 births
2016 deaths
Baseball players from Virginia
Washington Senators (1901–1960) players
Major League Baseball pitchers
Sportspeople from Lynchburg, Virginia
Wichita Indians players